Daniele Dessena (born 10 May 1987) is an Italian professional footballer who plays as a midfielder for  club Olbia on loan from Virtus Entella.

Club career

Parma
Dessena began his football career in the youth ranks of Parma and made his official debut in the first team on 27 February 2005 against Lazio. This season also made his debut in the UEFA Cup on 24 February 2005, in a 2–0 win against VfB Stuttgart. During the 2005–06 season he scored 3 goals in 17 games. During the 2006–07 season Dessena became one of the star players at Parma, he made 34 Serie A appearances scoring 2 goals, he also scored 2 goals in 6 games during the UEFA Cup campaign.

The 2007–08 season, Dessena played in 28 Serie A games for Parma. In total he played 101 games for Parma in all competitions scoring 7 goals in the Emilian shirt.

Sampdoria and Cagliari
In the summer of 2008 Dessena arrived at U.C. Sampdoria for a €4 million transfer fee. He made his debut on 31 August in a 1–1 draw against Inter Milan. On 23 October 2008, he scored his first goal for Sampdoria against Partizan Belgrade in the group stage of the UEFA Cup. He also scored a brace for Sampdoria in a 5–0 victory against Reggina on 9 May 2009. He made 25 appearances and scored two goals during his first season at the club.

On 31 August 2009, he joined fellow Serie A side Cagliari. On 27 September, he scored  his first goal for Cagliari in the game against his former team Parma. He scored again on 18 October against Catania and 14 March 2010 against Genoa.

On 25 June 2010, he was re-signed by Sampdoria after being brought back to the club by his former Parma Manager Domenico Di Carlo. Despite playing in a UEFA Champions League qualifier game for Sampdoria during the 2010–11 season, Sampdoria had to settle for a place in the UEFA Europa League after failing to progress to the group stages. Dessena made 6 appearances for Sampdoria during the Europa League campaign. However, the Serie A season ended in relegation to Serie B, Dessena stayed with the club in Serie B making 8 appearances during the first half of the 2011–12 season.

Cagliari
Having made only eight appearances in 2011–12 during the first part of the season for Sampdoria in Serie B, Dessena was loaned to Serie A club Cagliari in January for the remainder of the season. He made 12 appearances and scored 1 goal. After impressing during his 6-month loan spell, he joined Cagliari on a permanent deal in July 2012.

In the 2012–13 season he totalled 31 appearances and three goals under managers Massimo Ficcadenti and Ivo Pulga.

In the 2013–14 season he was deployed more frequently in a holding midfield position under new manager Luis Diego López. In February 2014, Dessena wore special rainbow laces against Inter Milan in support of Paddy Powers #Allacciamoli campaign to combat homophobia in football.

Brescia
On 10 January 2019, Dessena signed with Serie B club Brescia.

Pescara 
On 1 February 2021, Dessena signed with Serie B club Pescara.

Serie C
On 20 July 2021, he signed with Virtus Entella. On 1 February 2023, Dessena moved on loan to Olbia, with an obligation to buy.

International career
Dessena made 2 appearances for the Italy U18 team and 7 appearances for the U-19 team.

In May 2008 he won the Toulon Tournament with the Italy National Olympic team, assisting teammate Dani Osvaldo for the only goal of the victorious final against Chile. During the event, he scored a goal in Italy's victory over the United States. He played for Italy at the 2008 Summer Olympics in Beijing.

From 2006 to 2009, he was a regular member of the Italy U-21's, coached by Pierluigi Casiraghi.

In May 2009, he was called up to the European Championships but only made substitute appearances as second choice behind Luca Cigarini and Claudio Marchisio. He finished with a Bronze medal with Italy finishing in 3rd.

Career statistics
Updated 15 August 2020

Honours
Cagliari
Serie B: 2015–16

Italy U21
Toulon Tournament: 2008
UEFA European Under-21 Championship bronze: 2009

References

1987 births
Living people
Sportspeople from Parma
Italian people of Sardinian descent
Italian footballers
Association football midfielders
Serie A players
Serie B players
Serie C players
Parma Calcio 1913 players
U.C. Sampdoria players
Cagliari Calcio players
Brescia Calcio players
Delfino Pescara 1936 players
Virtus Entella players
Olbia Calcio 1905 players
Italy youth international footballers
Italy under-21 international footballers
Olympic footballers of Italy
Footballers at the 2008 Summer Olympics
Footballers from Emilia-Romagna